The Abyan campaign was a campaign for control of the Abyan Governorate of Yemen, between the Houthis and Yemen Army units loyal to Ali Abdullah Saleh on one side, and militiamen and Yemen Army units loyal to Abd Rabbuh Mansur Hadi on the other side, supported by jihadists of al-Qaeda in the Arabian Peninsula. The Pro-Hadi Forces recaptured the Abyan Governorate on 11 August 2015, after launching an offensive on pro-Houthi forces in early August.

The campaign
On 26 March 2015, the 15th Armored Brigade, based in Lawdar, announced their support for the Houthis. In turn, the 111th Infantry Brigade, based in the Ahwar District, joined forces with pro-Hadi troops five days later. In addition, Al-Qaeda in the Arabian Peninsula (AQAP) pledged to fight alongside pro-Hadi forces against the Houthis but clarified they were not loyal to Hadi.

On 27 March, Houthi and allied army forces seized the city of Shuqrah on the Arabian Sea. The takeover gave them control of all land entries to Aden and completed their encirclement of the city where a battle was underway. However, warplanes from the Saudi-led coalition began to bedevil the Houthis as they moved their heavy armour and vehicles toward Aden, with airstrikes halting a convoy from Shuqrah early on 28 March.

On 29 March, pro-Houthi troops captured Zinjibar, the provincial capital and a center for pro-Hadi forces in the governorate. 20 people were killed during the takeover. Heavy clashes took place between tribal fighters and Houthi-allied soldiers occupying a military camp and adjacent football field in the city, which was bombed twice by the Coalition.

On 3 April, Houthi forces entered the districts of Jaar, Lawdar and Shuqrah. Pro-Hadi military sources claimed that the 111th Infantry Brigade had cut off supplies to the Houthis and their allies on 7 April, but a source in the pro-Houthi 15th Armored Brigade said they had supplies still coming from the Al Bayda Governorate to the north. Sustained fighting took place during the day in Lawdar, while pro-Hadi forces reportedly besieged the base of the pro-Houthi army brigade.

On 25 April, at least 29 pro-Houthi fighters were killed in attacks throughout the province, according to an official.

On 8 August, Pro-Hadi forces launched an offensive to retake the city of Zinjibar from Houthi militias after the pro-government forces retook Jaʿār and Lawdar.

On 10 August, Pro-Hadi forces had retaken the provincial capital Zinjibar after just two days of fighting Houthi militias in the city, they will continue the offensive to retake the city of Shuqrah. On 11 August, Pro-Hadi forces had recaptured the entire Abyan Governorate.

References

2015 in Yemen
Battles involving Yemen
Conflicts in 2015
Military history of Yemen
Yemeni Crisis (2011–present)
Yemeni Civil War (2014–present)